New Abbey is a village in the historical county of Kirkcudbrightshire in Dumfries and Galloway, Scotland.

History
The village has a wealth of history including the ruined Cistercian abbey Sweetheart Abbey, founded by Lady Dervorguilla in 1273 in memory of her husband John Balliol. She kept his embalmed heart close to her for the rest of her life.  The monks named the abbey dulce cor ("sweet heart"). The village has a watermill, the New Abbey Corn Mill. Loch Kindar has a crannog and the village has the remains of Kirk Kindar (this was the parish church until just after 1633 when it was transferred to the refectory of the suppressed Sweetheart Abbey) on an island located just outside the village.

New Abbey was one of five parishes from Kirkcudbrightshire included in the Nithsdale district of Dumfries and Galloway under the local government reforms of 1975 which abolished Kirkcudbrightshire as an administrative county. The parish has therefore been included in the Dumfries lieutenancy area since 1975.

Description
The village has a saw mill, a hotel, a village shop, a coffee shop, a primary school, a doctor's surgery, a village hall, a bowling green, a football pitch – Maryfield Park (home to Abbey Vale FC) – and a Church of Scotland church. A Roman Catholic church, St Mary's, designed by the New Abbey born architect Walter Newall, closed in 2013. It is now The Thomas Bagnall Centre with occasional retreats and  Mass said here.

Two burns flow through the village: the New Abbey Pow which runs into the River Nith Estuary and the Sheep Burn.

Notable people
 Francis Campbell Boileau Cadell, (1883–1937),  Scottish colourist artist, friend of the Stewart family and frequent visitor to their home Shambellie House.
 James MacKenzie, recipient of the Victoria Cross for bravery
 Sir William Patterson, founder of the Bank of England, was buried in the village in 1719.
 Dougie Sharpe, Scottish League internationalist footballer and long time servant to Queen of the South from the club's days in Scotland's top division.

List of listed buildings 
List of listed buildings in New Abbey, Dumfries and Galloway

Notes

External links

 Parish of New Abbey on historical Kirkcudbright County website

Villages in Dumfries and Galloway
Kirkcudbrightshire
Parishes in Dumfries and Galloway